Sergio Sylvestre (born 5 December 1990) is an American-born singer, based in Italy. After moving to Italy, Sylvestre rose to fame winning the 15th series of Italian talent show Amici di Maria De Filippi. His debut extended play, Big Boy, topped the charts in Italy and was certified gold by the Federation of the Italian Music Industry. In 2017, Sylvestre competed in the 67th Sanremo Music Festival and performed "Con te", a song co-written by Giorgia, which was included in his self-titled debut album.

Biography
Sergio Sylvestre was born in Los Angeles to a Mexican mother and a Haitian father. In 2012, Sylvestre visited Southern Italy as a tourist. He later decided to move to Salento, and became the singer of the band Samsara Beach in Gallipoli.

Between 2015 and 2016, Sylvestre rose to fame as a contestant of the 15th series of Italian talent show Amici di Maria De Filippi, eventually becoming the series' winner, beating runner-up Elodie.
In May 2016, Sylvestre released his debut extended play, Big Boy, composed of four new songs and four cover versions of international hits. Big Boy reached the top spot of the Italian Albums Chart, and was later certified gold by the Federation of the Italian Music Industry. The single with same name was also certified gold in Italy. In Autumn 2016, Sylvestre should have embarked on the Big Boy Live Tour, including ten concerts throughout Italy, but the tour was later canceled due to other projects. He later recorded the song "Prego", Italian end credit version of the song "You're welcome", in a duet with Italian rapper Rocco Hunt, featured on the soundtrack of Oceania, the Italian version of the animated film Moana.

In February 2017, Sylvestre competed in the Big Artists section of the 67th Sanremo Music Festival, performing the song "Con te", co-written by Italian singer-songwriter Giorgia. The song was included in his first, self-titled, full-length album which was released in Italy on 10 February 2017.
On 17 November, of the same year, Sylvestre released his first Christmas album, titled Big Christmas.

Discography

Studio albums

Extended plays

Singles

As lead artist

As featured artist

Other charted songs

Other appearances

References

External links

1990 births
American musicians of Haitian descent
American musicians of Mexican descent
Italian-language singers
Living people
Singers from Los Angeles
Singing talent show winners
American expatriates in Italy
21st-century American singers